Kato is an indigenous village in the Potaro-Siparuni Region of Guyana. The village is mainly inhabited by Patamona people. The village is located in the Pacaraima Mountains.

Overview
The economy of the village is based on farming and gathering semi precious stones which are turned into jewelry at the Monkey Mountain lapidary.

The village has a primary and a secondary school. Kato has access to internet. The nearest hospital is located in Mahdia which can only be accessed by plane. A hydroelectric plant is under construction on the waterfalls of the nearby Chiung River and will provide electricity for Kato and neighbouring Paramakatoi.

Transport
There is an unpaved road between Karasabai and Kato. Kato is served by Kato Airport.

References

External links
 
 Kato Village Facebook page

Indigenous villages in Guyana
Populated places in Potaro-Siparuni